Suy Fatem (born June 2, 1998) an Ivorian model, personality television winner Miss Ivory Coast 2018.

Biography

Early and education 
Suy Fatem was born in Abidjan daughter of Appolos Lelou a taekwondo champion. She is a student in 2nd business communication at UCAO.

Career

References 

1998 births
Living people
Ivorian beauty pageant winners